Gore Springs is an unincorporated community located in Grenada County, Mississippi, United States and is part of the Grenada Micropolitan Statistical Area.

Although an unincorporated community, Gore Springs has a post office and a zip code of 38929.

Gallery

References

Unincorporated communities in Grenada County, Mississippi
Unincorporated communities in Mississippi